Bola Kampung (Robokicks in English; international title: Football Kids) is a Malaysian animated television series, revolves around the kampung boys who are passionate in football. The series, spanned with 6 seasons and 78 episodes, aired from 2006 to 2010 on TV2 and it is viewed in more than 16 countries including Indonesia, Brunei, Thailand, Singapore, Philippines, Vietnam and Turkey.

Premise
The story is set in a kampung named Gong Lechar in the Pohon Bambu district; this story revolves around a group of adolescents who have great passions towards football. However, they only play it for the sake of fun. Not until the principal Mr Doud and the newlywed appointed coach, Mr Abdul Rahman decided to form a football team representing their school in the inter school competition. Iwan leads the team in its struggles to become the best in the district. Alas, his dream is against by his father, Azman who doesn't want Iwan to suffer the same fate as him. Azman was once a national player who suffered a tragic fate that tarnished his football career. With the support of his friends, Azizul and Sabok, Iwan manage to steer aside the problems and emerges as the backbone of the team. With togetherness, the team strives to overcome challenges that come along the way in order to achieve their dreams.

Characters
Iwan (English Dub: Ivan) — Joyful and happy-go-lucky, Iwan's dream is to play for the national team. His idol is Zinedane Zidane. Iwan plays as the midfielder, and his passings are accurate and deadly. He also plays an important role in the team as the captain.
Fauzi (English Dub: Felix) — Met Ivan during the School Holidays. After that he played in the Pohon Meranti district while meeting Iwan again on the field. He is known as an architect on the field as he has a high skill level and a fine technique. He now plays as a midfielder just like Iwan. He moved to England because his dad got transferred (in season 4)
Sabok (English Dub: Samuel) — A good friend of Iwan. He is a right-winger with a good control of the both on both feet. He is smart about creating opportunities in front of the goal while deflecting defenders. He is known as a "Pro" at free kicks. 
Azizul (English Dub: Donovan) — His strength lies as a left-winger is his fast runs and accurate passes. His strong legs are a product of hard work helping his father on the paddy fields. 
Kumar (English Dub: Kevin) — He is always worried about his skill level as a striker. His ever increasing stomach size makes his work harder. Thus, he has to work harder to achieve victory. 
Santokh (English Dub: Sean) — A person with a strong ego and very competitive. He believes that he is the best and doesn't work well with others. Nonetheless, he has great talent as a striker and is feared by his opponents with his fast runs and dribbles
Szeto (English Dub: Simon) — His reputation as the best goalkeeper around is the product of his dedication to helping his father peel off coconuts every day. 
Ah Hock (English Dub: Albert) — Even though he's the best friend to Santokh, Ah Hock is a kind heart whose decisions are always influenced by Santokh. His skills as a striker are only average. 
Amad and Amid (English Dub: Adam and Abel) — Twins who are in the team to defend together. They are very aggressive and have a strong fighting spirit. Their skills enable them to be among the best defenders around. 
Nasha (English Dub: Nicole) — She is the daughter to the Tok Ketua (Village Leader) and is a good friend to Iwan. She is also interested in Football and believes that hard work always pays off. 
Iskandar (English Dub: Marcus) — A player from Mahakarma in Season 1 and moved to Jayapati in Season 2. He likes to play the PSP console shown in Season 5. He has a rich cousin named Jalil. He is a striker. 
Chin and Chun (English Dub: Chad and Clay) — Twins with two different positions in the team. Chin is a defender while Chun is a goalkeeper.

Episodes

Season 1 (2006)

Season 2 (2007)

Season 3 (2008)

Season 4 (2009)

Season 5 (2010)

Season 6 (2010)
Note: But Season 6 13 Episode Of "Bola Kampung X"

International broadcasts

Film adaptations 

A film based on the series, Bola Kampung the Movie was released in March 2013.

Notes

References

External links
 
 

2006 Malaysian television series debuts
2010 Malaysian television series endings
2000s Malaysian television series
2010s Malaysian television series
Malaysian children's animated television series
Animated sports television series
Fictional association football television series
Association football animation